Lipasti is a surname. Notable people with the surname include:

 Irja Lipasti (1905–2000), Finnish sprinter
  (born 1997), Finnish wrestler
 Mikko Herman Lipasti, American engineer

Finnish-language surnames